Samuel Tetteh  (born 28 July 1996) is a Ghanaian footballer who plays as a forward for Turkish club Adanaspor.

Club career

Early career
Tetteh started playing for the West African Football Academy in 2014. He played in the 2016 season which he scored 5 goals in 13 matches and was labeled as one of the rising stars in the Ghana Premier League and scoring against Asante Kotoko S.C. in his debut match. He started attracting scouts and teams from Europe due to his good form and being seen as a future prospect.

FC Liefering
Tetteh joined FC Liefering the feeder club of FC Red Bull Salzburg during the summer of 2016. In his debut season for the Austrian side he scored 10 goals and provided assists for 5 goals, meaning he contributed to 15 goals in 20 matches.

LASK Linz
Due to his impressive displays for FC Liefering, in January 2017, Tetteh was promoted into the FC Red Bull Salzburg squad.

Tetteh was loaned out to fellow Austrian club LASK Linz for one and half season starting from January 2018. He ended the 2017–18 season with 5 goals 6 assists helping the team to a 4th place and qualification into the Europa league.

New York Red Bulls
On 11 August 2020, Tetteh moved on loan to MLS side New York Red Bulls for the 2020 season with a club option to make the transfer permanent. On 30 November 2020, New York declined to make the deal for Tetteh permanent.

St. Pölten
On 19 January 2021, Tetth moved on loan to Austrian Bundesliga side St. Pölten.

International career
Tetteh made his first senior international appearance in a friendly against Congo on 1 September 2015, having substituted Solomon Asante in the 90th minute. On 3 September 2016, Tetteh scored his first international goal for Ghana.

Career statistics

Club

International goals
Scores and results list Ghana's goal tally first.

References

External links
 
 

1996 births
Living people
Ghanaian footballers
Association football forwards
Ghana international footballers
Ghana under-20 international footballers
Ghanaian expatriate footballers
Ghanaian expatriate sportspeople in Austria
Ghanaian expatriate sportspeople in the United States
Expatriate footballers in Austria
FC Red Bull Salzburg players
FC Liefering players
LASK players
New York Red Bulls players
SKN St. Pölten players
2017 Africa Cup of Nations players
2. Liga (Austria) players
Major League Soccer players
West African Football Academy players